The 45th Annual American Music Awards took place on November 19, 2017, at the Microsoft Theater in Los Angeles, California. It was broadcast on ABC and was hosted by Tracee Ellis Ross.

Performances

Notes
  Broadcast live from Capital One Arena in Washington, D.C.

Presenters

Ansel Elgort 
Billy Eichner 
Caleb McLaughlin
Camila Mendes
Chadwick Boseman
The Chainsmokers 
Chris Hardwick
Chrissy Metz
Ciara
Daymond John
DJ Khaled
G-Eazy
Gaten Matarazzo
Heidi Klum
Jared Leto
Jenna Dewan-Tatum
Jesse Tyler Ferguson
Julia Michaels
Justin Hartley
Kat Graham
Kathryn Hahn
Kevin O'Leary
KJ Apa
Laura Marano
Lea Michele
Lili Reinhart
Lilly Singh
Madelaine Petsch
Mark Cuban
Martin Garrix
Nick Cannon
Patrick Schwarzenegger
Sabrina Carpenter
Sadie Sink
Viola Davis
Yara Shahidi

Winners and Nominees

Special awards
 Lifetime Achievement
 Diana Ross

References

2017
2017 music awards
2017 awards in the United States